The Bagan Serai railway station is a Malaysian train station located at and named after the town of Bagan Serai, Perak. It was later upgraded to an elevated station as part of the double-tracking and electrification project of the railway.

External links
 Bagan Serai Railway Station

Kerian District
KTM ETS railway stations
Railway stations in Perak